The Old Palmetto Hotel is a historic hotel in Vero Beach, Florida. Located at 1889 Old Dixie Highway the Palmetto Hotel was constructed in 1921 by George W. Gray. The hotel provided a social center for the community as well as a lodging site for the many winter guests who would visit annually. After serving the county offices, it was enlarged in 1926 and in the 1930s it became the Kromhout Apartments, later it became Charlton Apartments, then Skippers Inn, and later in 1989, the Regent Court Apartments. On November 13, 1991, it was added to the U.S. National Register of Historic Places.

References

External links

 Indian River County listings at Florida's Office of Cultural and Historical Programs

National Register of Historic Places in Indian River County, Florida
Buildings and structures in Vero Beach, Florida
Hotels established in 1921
1921 establishments in Florida